Deltophora sella is a moth of the family Gelechiidae. It is found in the United States (North Carolina, Florida, Arkansas, Texas and California).

The length of the forewings is 5–7 mm. The forewings are grey or brownish grey, either with or without dark markings. Adults have been recorded on wing from March to September and in November.

Subspecies
Deltophora sella sella (North Carolina, Florida, Arkansas, Texas)
Deltophora sella atacta (Meyrick, 1927) (south-western Texas)
Deltophora sella californica Sattler, 1979 (California)

References

Moths described in 1874
Deltophora